The Lexington Subdivision was a line operated by the Chesapeake & Ohio Railway between Ashland and Lexington in the U.S. state of Kentucky. Large sections of the line were built by the Elizabethtown, Lexington and Big Sandy Railroad, a predecessor to the Lexington and Big Sandy Railroad. The C&O purchased the railroad in 1892 and connected its mainline in Ashland, KY. The C&O had a large yard in Lexington, KY, named the "Netherlands Yard." Most of the right-of-way was torn up in the mid-1980s due to little online traffic and the difficulty of maintaining a line running perpendicular to Kentucky's draining pattern.  

A portion of the line from Ashland west to the Boyd-Carter County line was left in place to serve a steel "mini-mill" at the current end of the line, plus a small brick yard a couple miles east of the steel mill.  In 2005, a three-track yard was constructed to serve a landfill operation adjacent to the old main line, consisting of open-top gondolas with trash from New Jersey.  Eight years later, in early 2013, a new contract with the landfill took effect, resulting in large trains of trash containers being transported to the landfill.  This required modification of the two tunnels at Ashland and Princess to increase clearances for the new trains, as well as track improvements to handle the extra weight of the cars and locomotives.

In November 2015, the owner of the landfill, Envirosolutions Inc, announced that it would cease rail trash intake by the end of June 2016 after numerous complaints by local residents, as well as a lawsuit by members of the community.

References

Chesapeake and Ohio Railway
Closed railway lines in the United States